"Yup" is a song written by Shane Minor, Wade Kirby, and Phil O'Donnell and recorded by American country music artist Easton Corbin. It was released in July 2015 as the third single from Corbin's album About to Get Real.

Critical reception
An uncredited Taste of Country review stated that "Sonically, Corbin stays true to his traditional roots. He’s a favorite among those calling for a return to a more organic sound on the radio, and on “Yup” he does nothing to push his signature sound to an edge. There’s always room for him on the radio."

Chart performance

On the week of December 5th, 2015, "Yup" peaked at number 35 on the Billboard Country Airplay chart.

References

2015 songs
2015 singles
Easton Corbin songs
Mercury Nashville singles
Songs written by Shane Minor
Songs written by Wade Kirby
Song recordings produced by Carson Chamberlain
Songs written by Phil O'Donnell (songwriter)